Anisophyllea griffithii is a species of plant in the Anisophylleaceae family. It is found in Malaysia and Singapore.

References

griffithii
Least concern plants
Taxonomy articles created by Polbot
Taxa named by Daniel Oliver